Samuel Richard Shade (born June 14, 1973) is an American football coach and former player, currently the head coach of the Miles College football team. He played eight seasons in the National Football League (NFL) from 1995 to 2002 as a safety for the Cincinnati Bengals and the Washington Redskins. Shade played college football at the University of Alabama and was selected in the fourth round of the 1995 NFL Draft.

Coaching career

Samford
Shade was the Special teams and defensive passing game coordinator at Samford, where he helped mentor current NFL defensive backs Corey White, Jaquiski Tartt, and James Bradberry.

Georgia State
On December 15, 2016, Shade was added to the staff at Georgia State as the cornerbacks coach.

Cleveland Browns
On February 7, 2018, it was announced that Shade had joined the Cleveland Browns' as an assistant special teams coach.

Pinson Valley High School
In February 2020, Pinson Valley High School named Shade as the replacement for Patrick Nix.
In his first year as head coach, he helped bring the team back to a successful 12–2 season, including the state championship.

Miles College
On January 26, 2022 Miles College introduced Shade as head football coach.

Head coaching record

References

External links
 Miles profile

1973 births
Living people
American football safeties
Alabama Crimson Tide football players
Cincinnati Bengals players
Cleveland Browns coaches
Georgia State Panthers football coaches
Miles Golden Bears football coaches
Samford Bulldogs football coaches
Washington Redskins players
High school football coaches in Alabama
Coaches of American football from Alabama
Players of American football from Birmingham, Alabama
African-American coaches of American football
African-American players of American football
20th-century African-American sportspeople
21st-century African-American sportspeople